Events in the year 1870 in India.

Incumbents
Richard Bourke, 6th Earl of Mayo, Viceroy

Events
National income - ₹3,332 million
 The first submarine telegraph cable from UK landed in Bombay.
 The United Service Institution (USI) was founded
 Indian Reform Association was formed on 29 October with Keshab Chandra Sen as president. It represented the secular side of the Brahmo Samaj and included many who did not belong to the Brahmo Samaj. The objective was to put into practice some of the ideas Sen was exposed to during his visit to Great Britain.

Law
Court-Fees Act
Coinage Act (British statute)
Extradition Act (British statute)
Foreign Enlistment Act (British statute)
Birth 
30 April 1870 -- Dhundiraj Govind Phalke, known as Dadasaheb Phalke, the Father of Indian Cenema (Died 16 February 1944)

References

External links 
 United Service Institution

 
India
Years of the 19th century in India